Pettersson is a common Swedish patronymic surname, meaning "son of Peter".

Geographical distribution
As of 2014, 92.7% of all known bearers of the surname Pettersson were residents of Sweden (frequency 1:151), 1.7% of Finland (1:4,550), 1.3% of Norway (1:5,791) and 1.0% of Denmark (1:8,338).

In Sweden, the frequency of the surname was higher than national average (1:151) in the following counties:
 1. Gotland County (1:34)
 2. Södermanland County (1:72)
 3. Västmanland County (1:75)
 4. Örebro County (1:80)
 5. Uppsala County (1:87)
 6. Östergötland County (1:101)
 7. Västernorrland County (1:126)
 8. Gävleborg County (1:129)
 9. Dalarna County (1:134)
 10. Norrbotten County (1:137)
 11. Värmland County (1:143)

In Finland, the frequency of the surname was higher than national average (1:4,550) in the following regions:
 1. Åland (1:182)
 2. Ostrobothnia (1:1,224)
 3. Southwest Finland (1:2,209)
 4. Uusimaa (1:3,525)
 5. Central Ostrobothnia (1:3,934)

People
Albert Pettersson, Swedish Olympic weightlifter
Aline Pettersson, Mexican writer
Allan Pettersson, composer
Allan Rune Pettersson, writer
Anna Pettersson, lawyer
Anton Pettersson (1994-2015), perpetrator of the 2015 Trollhättan school attack
Birgitta Pettersson, film actor
Bjarne Pettersson, Danish football player
Carl Pettersson, golfer
Christer Pettersson, suspected assassin
Elias Pettersson, ice hockey player
Erik Pettersson (bandy), Swedish bandy player
Erik Pettersson (weightlifter), Swedish Olympic weightlifter 
Erik Pettersson (cyclist), Swedish Olympic cyclist
Fredrik Pettersson, ice hockey player
Gert Pettersson, orienteer
Göran Pettersson, politician
Gösta Pettersson, road racing cyclist
Hans Pettersson, Swedish atomic physicist and oceanographer
Holger Pettersson, Swedish radiologist and educator
Ingvar Pettersson, athlete
Joel Pettersson, painter and writer
Johan Pettersson (disambiguation)
Jörgen Pettersson (footballer), football player
Jörgen Pettersson (ice hockey), ice hockey player
Katja Pettersson, Finnish designer
Kim Pettersson, musician
Kjell-Ronnie Pettersson, ice hockey player
Leif Pettersson, politician
Linus Pettersson, bandy player
Marcus Pettersson, ice hockey player
Marina Pettersson, politician
Pelle Pettersson, Swedish yachtsman and yacht designer
Rolf Pettersson, orienteer
Ronald Pettersson, ice hockey player
Ronney Pettersson, football player
Stefan Pettersson (footballer), football player
Stefan Pettersson (ice hockey), ice hockey player
Sten Pettersson, athlete
Sven Pettersson, ski jumper
Sven-Pelle Pettersson, swimmer and water polo player
Wivan Pettersson, swimmer

See also
 Pedersen
 Petersen
 Peterson 
 Petterson 
 Petersson

References

Swedish-language surnames
Patronymic surnames